Itaguari is a municipality in central Goiás state, Brazil.

Location and Connections

Highway connections are made by state highway GO-070 from Goiânia to Goianira / Inhumas / Itauçu / GO-154 / Taquaral de Goiás. For a list of all the distances in the state of Goiás see Seplan

Neighboring municipalities are Itaberaí, Itaguaru, Jaraguá, and Taquaral de Goiás

Demographics
Population density:  	31.39 inhabitants/km2 (2007)
Number of voters: 	3,556 (December/2007)
Population growth rate:  -0.15% 1996/2007
Urban population: 3,653 (2007)
Rural population: 601

The economy
The main economic activities are cattle raising (24,600 head in 2006) and agriculture (rice, sugarcane, corn, and tomatoes).
Number of industrial establishments: 7
Number of retail establishments: 35
Banking establishments: none
Dairies:  Laticínios Ramos Ltda., LAI - Laticínios e Agropecuária Itaguari Ltda. (22/05/2006)
Automobiles: 461

Agricultural data 2006
Farms:  315
Total area:  11,282 ha.
Area of permanent crops: 336 ha. (bananas)
Area of perennial crops: 431 ha. (rice, tomatoes, corn, sugarcane, and manioc)
Area of natural pasture:  9,304 ha.
Area of woodland and forests:  1,134 ha.
Persons dependent on farming:  650
Farms with tractors: 14
Number of tractors:  20
Cattle herd:  24,600 head IBGE

Health and education
Hospitals: none
Hospital beds: n/a
Health establishments (Sistema Único de Saúde-SUS): 3
Schools: 3
Classrooms: 30
Teachers: 51
Number of students: 1,159
Infant mortality rate: 82.1
Literacy rate: 28.8

Human Development Index

Itaguai scored 0.720 on the Municipal Human Development Index, giving it a state ranking of 175 (out of 242 municipalities in 2000)
and a national ranking of 2,627 (out of 5,507 municipalities in 2000).  For the complete list see Frigoletto

See also
List of municipalities in Goiás
Microregions of Goiás

References

Frigoletto

Municipalities in Goiás